The 59th Hong Kong–Macau Interport was held in Hong Kong on 22 May 2004. It was originally scheduled to be held on 1 May 2003, but was postponed due to the outbreak of SARS. Hong Kong captured the champion by winning 6-0.

Squads

Hong Kong

Hong Kong was represented by its youth team with age eligible to play for the 2008 Summer Olympics.
 Honorary Directors: Martin Hong, Lawrence Yu Kam-kee
 Coaches: Lai Sun Cheung, Tsang Wai Chung
 Goalkeeper Coach: Chu Kwok Kuen
 Administrator: Kwan Kon San
 Physio: Lui Yat Hong

Macau 
Macau was represented by its youth team. The following only shows the players played in the match.

Results

References

Hong Kong–Macau Interport
Macau
Hong